Daryl "Chill" Mitchell (born July 16, 1965) is an American actor and rapper. He is known for such roles as Dexter Walker on The John Larroquette Show, Tommy Webber in Galaxy Quest, Leo Michaels on Veronica's Closet, Eli Goggins III on Ed, and Patton Plame on NCIS: New Orleans.

Early life
Mitchell was born in The Bronx, to a secretary mother and a bus driver father. He grew up in Wyandanch.

Career
During the 1980s, Mitchell was a member of hip hop group Groove B. Chill. Mitchell made his film debut in House Party (1990). He had taken the role for both financial reasons and in hopes of popularizing his music. After acting in the sequel, Mitchell decided to leave music to focus strictly on acting.

His first regular role on television was on the sitcom Here and Now as T. Mitchell landed the role of Dexter, a lunch attendant that often argued with the protagonist, on sitcom The John Larroquette Show (1993−96). For his work on John Larroquette, Mitchell was nominated for an NAACP Image Award in 1996 for Outstanding Supporting Actor in a Comedy Series. He appeared regularly as marketing director Leo on Veronica's Closet from 1997 to 2000.

He appeared as Wally, a mechanic, in Sgt. Bilko (1996), with Steve Martin and Chris Rock among his co-stars. Mitchell was Earl in A Thin Line Between Love and Hate (1996) and played Roy in Home Fries (1998). Mitchell appeared as Raul in the Disney film Toothless (1997) alongside Veronica's Closet co-star Kirstie Alley.

In 1999, Mitchell acted in two feature films. He appeared as English teacher Mr. Morgan in 10 Things I Hate About You and portrayed Tommy Webber, a fictional actor who performed as Lieutenant Laredo during childhood, in the science fiction spoof Galaxy Quest.

He appeared as police officer Chambers in Lucky Numbers (2000) and was Steve in Black Knight (2001). Mitchell played a state trooper in The Country Bears (2002), which finished filming shortly before his motorcycle accident.

Mitchell's first role following his accident was Eli, a bowling alley manager, in Ed (2002−04). He joined the series in its third season. The producers of the series, already feeling the ensemble was too large, balked at the idea of another character being introduced. However, producer Jon Beckerman's worries were quelled upon meeting Mitchell and he was taken by Mitchell's sense of humor, leading to the character of Eli being created.

In 2009, he portrayed Chill Trainor in the short-lived sitcom Brothers with Michael Strahan. A reviewer for The New York Times found Mitchell's character to be the most interesting, and praised the actor's line delivery. Despite the show's short run, Mitchell received his second NAACP Image Award nomination in 2010, in the category of Outstanding Actor in a Comedy Series. Mitchell went on to win the award on February 26, 2010. From 2014 to 2021 he starred in NCIS: New Orleans as recurring-turned-main character Patton Plame, a computer specialist for NCIS. In 2018, he joined the cast of Fear the Walking Dead portraying Wendell.

In September 2009, Mitchell was profiled on TV One's biographical documentary program Life After, a series that examines the lives of celebrities following a career turning point.

Personal life
Mitchell and his wife, Carol, have three children. , they live in Sugar Hill, Georgia, a suburb of Atlanta.

Accident
On November 10, 2001, Mitchell was paralyzed from the waist down after a motorcycle crash on an island near Beaufort, South Carolina, in which he lost control of his bike after turning a corner and encountering gravel and loose pavement. He woke up five days later in the hospital. Mitchell got full support from his family and friends, including Denzel Washington and Chris Tucker, to continue his career. He had a recurring role thereafter on the TV program Ed between 2002 and 2004 as a bowling alley manager who was paralyzed after an accident.

Mitchell later started the Daryl Mitchell Foundation to raise awareness of spinal cord injury, and serves as the Minority Outreach spokesman for the Christopher and Dana Reeve Foundation. He has also become a strong advocate for employing actors with disabilities.

Filmography

Film/Movie

Television

Awards and nominations

Studio album
 Starting From Zero (A&M, 1990) (with Groove B. Chill)

References

External links
Daryl Mitchell Foundation

Daryl Mitchell interview with ABILITY Magazine

1965 births
20th-century African-American male singers
20th-century American male actors
20th-century American musicians
21st-century African-American musicians
21st-century American male actors
21st-century American rappers
Actors with disabilities
African-American male actors
American male film actors
American male television actors
Living people
Male actors from New York City
People from Gwinnett County, Georgia
People from Wyandanch, New York
People with paraplegia
Rappers from the Bronx
Wheelchair users